Dhanghata is a constituency of the Uttar Pradesh Legislative Assembly covering the city of Dhanghata in the Sant Kabir Nagar district of Uttar Pradesh, India. It is one of five assembly constituencies in the Sant Kabir Nagar Lok Sabha constituency. Since 2008, this assembly constituency is numbered 314 amongst 403 constituencies.

Since 2017, Bharatiya Janta Party member Sriram Chauhan is the MLA, who won in the 2017 Uttar Pradesh Legislative Assembly election defeating Samajwadi Party candidate Agloo Prasad by a margin of 16,909 votes.

Members of the Legislative Assembly

Election results

18th Vidhan Sabha: 2022 General Elections

17th Vidhan Sabha: 2017 General Elections

16th Vidhan Sabha: 2012 General Elections

References

External links
 

Assembly constituencies of Uttar Pradesh
Sant Kabir Nagar district